is a male Japanese light novelist from Fukui, Japan. In June 2003, he made his debut with the Ballad of a Shinigami series of light novel and has gone on to create several other works. He enjoys listening to the bands Bump of Chicken, The Pillows, Number Girl, and Zazen Boys, among others, and makes references to song lyrics produced by these bands in his work.

Works
Ballad of a Shinigami
Bludgeoning Angel Dokuro-Chan desu (collaboration)
Jii-chan Jet!!
Mizutama Panic.

External links
K-Ske Hasegawa's personal website 

Light novelists
Writers from Fukui Prefecture
Living people
Year of birth missing (living people)